John J. Vaughan (November 19, 1903 – December 26, 1978) was an American football back who played two seasons with the Pittsburgh Pirates of the National Football League. He played college football at the Indiana University of Pennsylvania and attended Bellefonte Academy in Bellefonte, Pennsylvania.

References

External links
Just Sports Stats

1903 births
1978 deaths
Players of American football from Philadelphia
American football running backs
IUP Crimson Hawks football players
Pittsburgh Pirates (football) players